Radical 169 or radical gate meaning "gate" or "door" is one of the 9 Kangxi radicals (214 radicals in total) composed of 8 strokes.

In the Kangxi Dictionary, there are 246 characters (out of 49,030) to be found under this radical.

Evolution

Derived characters

Literature

External links

Unihan Database - U+9580

169
047